Paul J.J. Welfens (29 January 1957 – 11 November 2022) was a German economist. 

He was born in Düren, West Germany and studied economics in Wuppertal, Duisburg and Paris. He obtained his PhD in 1985 and his full professorship in 1989, after which he became professor at the Wilhelms University of Münster and the University of Potsdam. 

From 2004, Welfens was the chair professor for economics with a focus on  macroeconomic theory and policy at the Bergisch University of Wuppertal, and the Jean Monnet professor for European Economic Integration. In 2007 he took a visiting professorship at the Institut d'Etudes Politiques de Paris (Paris Institute of Political Studies).  In the same year he was the first German to be awarded the silver medal of the International N. D. Kondratiev Foundation. 

Welfens was founder and president  of the European Institute for International Economic Relations (EIIW) at the University of Wuppertal, which is a non-partisan, non-profit research institute looking at issues such as globalization and multinational companies, banking developments and capital markets, ICT and digitalization, trade, economic integration amongst others. He has published books and journal papers on many pressing contemporary issues concerning economic integration and the world economy, including on Brexit, structural populism in the US under President Trump and the impact on US-EU-China/Asia relations, and most recently on the macroeconomic and health system effects of the coronavirus pandemic.

Selected publications 
Welfens has published over 160 works and academic papers.
 European Monetary Integration, Springer, February 1994
 Grundlagen der Wirtschaftspolitik (Springer-Lehrbuch), Springer Verlag, Mai 1995 Paperback
 Grundlagen der Wirtschaftspolitik von Paul J.J. Welfens
 Internationalization of the Economy and Environmental Policy Options, Springer, September 2001 Hardcover
 European Monetary Union, Springer, Oktober 1997 Hardcover
 Stabilizing and Integrating the Balkans, Springer, Mai 2001 Hardcover
 Globalization of the Economy, Unemployment and Innovation, Springer, August 1999 Hardcover
 Globalization, economic growth and innovation dynamics, Springer, 1999
 Structural change and exchange rate dynamics Springer, 2005 
 Integration in Asia and Europe, Springer, 2006
 Innovations in Macroeconomics, Springer, 2008
 Digital integration, growth and rational regulation, Springer, 2008
 Brexit aus Versehen: Europäsiche Union zwischen Desintegration und neuer EU, Springer, 2017
 An Accidental BREXIT, Palgrave Macmillan, 2017
 The Global Trump: Structural US Populism and Economic Conflicts with Europe and Asia, Palgrave Macmillan, 2019
 Klimaschutzpolitik - Das Ende der Komfortzone: Neue wirtschaftliche und internationale Perspektiven zur Klimadebatte'', Springer, 2019

References 

1957 births
Living people
German economists
People from Düren
Academic staff of the University of Münster
Academic staff of the University of Potsdam
Academic staff of the University of Wuppertal
N. D. Kondratieff Medal laureates
2022 deaths